Kellyanne Farquhar is a Scottish television actress. She joined the cast of the BBC's Monarch of the Glen for its final series in 2005, starring as boarding school runaway Amy McDougal. 

She won a Scottish Bafta Best First Time Performance for her role in Monarch. She also appeared in the New Found Land film Night People which won the audience award at the Bafta Scotland awards 2005.

Kellyanne graduated from Queen Margaret University College in 2004.

References

External links
 

Alumni of Queen Margaret University
Scottish television actresses
Living people
Year of birth missing (living people)
Place of birth missing (living people)